Sâmbăta de Sus Monastery is a Romanian Orthodox monastery in Sâmbăta de Sus, Brașov County, in the Transylvania region of Romania. Dedicated to the Dormition of the Mother of God, it is also known as the Brâncoveanu Monastery (Mănăstirea Brâncoveanu).

History

There is evidence of skete monasticism being practiced in the area by the early 17th century. Sâmbăta de Sus village and surrounding land entered into the Brâncoveanu family's possession in 1654. Constantin Brâncoveanu, Prince of Wallachia, built a stone and brick church in place of an older wooden one around 1696, with the monastery established by 1701. Part of his motivation was to strengthen the Orthodox presence in the region and guard against encroaching Catholicism, which had become a more pressing issue after 1683 and the consolidation of Habsburg domination over Transylvania. Concurrent with the monastery's establishment, the Romanian Greek-Catholic Church was founded, drawing numerous Transylvanian Orthodox under Papal authority. Brâncoveanu also established a school for secretaries, a workshop for fresco paintings and a small printing press at the monastery site.

Over the course of the 18th century, there was pressure on the monks to accept union with Rome. In 1761, Adolf von Buccow, Governor of Transylvania, ordered the destruction of all Orthodox monasteries under his jurisdiction. Sâmbăta de Sus was spared, probably following an intervention by the Brâncoveanu family. Its prestige grew, as it remained the only Orthodox monastery in Țara Făgărașului. The gilt interior frescoes were painted in 1766. From 1772 to 1802, the Brâncoveanus lost control over the property due to failure to pay a debt, rendering its destruction easier. Greek-Catholic Bishop Grigore Maior insisted it be suppressed, as its monks not only refused to convert, but also urged local inhabitants not to do so. In 1782, an order from the imperial court in Vienna decreed that all monasteries whose inhabitants led lives only of contemplation should be disbanded. Despite pleas from the Brâncoveanus, the monastery was destroyed in November 1785. The church was severely damaged although not demolished, and the monks most likely crossed the Carpathians into Wallachia.

In 1922, following the union of Transylvania with Romania and subsequent land reform, the Romanian government transferred the property from the Brâncoveanu family to the Sibiu Archdiocese. Nicolae Bălan, then Sibiu's archbishop as well as Metropolitan of Transylvania, decided to restore the monastery. Work began in 1926, with the rebuilt church and other structures consecrated in 1946. A number of further restorations followed, with a major one concluding in 1993. The monastery is classified at a historic monument by Romania's Ministry of Culture and Religious Affairs. In addition, three individual properties are listed as such: the church, the annexes and the park.

Notes

External links

 Official site

Romanian Orthodox monasteries of Transylvania
Tourist attractions in Brașov County
Buildings and structures in Brașov County
Christian monasteries established in the 18th century
Religious buildings and structures completed in 1701
Historic monuments in Brașov County
1701 establishments in the Habsburg monarchy
18th-century establishments in Hungary